Rowsham is a hamlet in the parish of Wingrave in Buckinghamshire, England. It is south of the main village on the A418 road that links Bierton with Wing. It is in the civil parish of Wingrave with Rowsham.

Rowsham's toponym is derived from Old English, meaning "Hrothwulf's home".  In manorial rolls of 1170 it was recorded as Rollesham.

References

Hamlets in Buckinghamshire